Stephen Grosz (born 1952) is a psychoanalyst and author.

Born in Indiana and educated at the University of California, Berkeley and Balliol College, Oxford, Grosz teaches clinical technique at the Institute of Psychoanalysis and psychoanalytic theory at University College London. He has been Consultant Adult Psychotherapist at the Portman Clinic in London. His writings have appeared in the Financial Times and Granta.

His book, The Examined Life, was published by Chatto and Windus (UK) in January 2013, and spent the first three months after publication in the top ten of the Sunday Times non-fiction bestseller list.

The Examined Life was published in the United States by W.W. Norton and in Canada by Random House Canada in May 2013. It has been translated into over 25 languages including Danish, Dutch, German, Italian, Korean, Portuguese, Russian, Spanish, Swedish and Turkish, and will soon be published in Chinese, Hebrew and Japanese.

In The New York Times, Michiko Kakutani praised the book as “an insightful and beautifully written… a series of slim, piercing chapters that read like a combination of Chekhov and Oliver Sacks.”

An abridged version of the book was broadcast on BBC Radio 4. The Examined Life was long-listed for the 2013 Guardian First Book Award.

The Examined Life was chosen as one of 2013’s Books of the Year in: The New York Times (Michiko Kakutani),  Sunday Times (James McConnachie), Observer (Lisa Appignanesi), Salon (Emma Brockes), Mail on Sunday (Craig Brown), Observer (Lucy Lethbridge), The British Psychological Society.

External links 
 Author Website
 Profile at The Guardian
 The Bookseller
 Rogers, Coleridge and White Literary Agency
 Night and Day, Issue Three, Vintage Books
 Poet Wendy Cope in conversation with Stephen Grosz
 "The Fire Alarm is Ringing. What Are You Waiting For?" (Excerpt from Stephen Grosz's The Examined Life)

References 

Living people
University of California, Berkeley alumni
Alumni of Balliol College, Oxford
Academics of University College London
American psychotherapists
British psychoanalysts
1952 births